Bangladesh Carrom Federation is the national federation for carrom and is responsible for governing the sport in Bangladesh. Zunaid Ahmed Palak, Member of Parliament and State Minister of Information and Communication Technology, is the President of the Bangladesh Carrom Federation.

History
Bangladesh Carrom Federation was established in 1990. In 1998, Bangladesh Carrom Federation started receiving funding from the National Sports Council under the Ministry of Youth and Sports. It also received space for its headquarters at the government-owned Maulana Bhasani Hockey Stadium. It is a member of the Asian Carrom Confederation and International Carrom Federation.

References

Carrom in Bangladesh
Carrom organisations
1990 establishments in Bangladesh
Sports organizations established in 1990
Carrom
Organisations based in Dhaka